Events in the year 1891 in music.

Specific locations
1891 in Norwegian music

Events 
 February 23 – Fourteen-year-old cellist Pablo Casals gives a solo recital in Barcelona.
 March 16 – A performance of the Budapest Opera is interrupted by a spontaneous demonstration in support of musical director Gustav Mahler, at the time in conflict with intendant Géza Zichy and already negotiating for a position elsewhere.
 May 5 – The Music Hall in New York City (which becomes Carnegie Hall) has its grand opening and first public performance, with Peter Ilyich Tchaikovsky guest-conducting his own work.
 May 10 – Danish classical composer Carl Nielsen marries his compatriot, the sculptor Anne Marie Brodersen, in St Mark's English Church, Florence, Italy, the couple having first met on March 2 in Paris. 
June 24 - Pyotr Ilyich Tchaikovsky finished his ballet The Nutcracker
 October 16 – The Chicago Symphony Orchestra gives its inaugural concert.
The Peabody Mason Concerts are inaugurated with a performance by Ferruccio Busoni.
The ensemble attached to the Glasgow Choral Union is formally recognised as the Scottish Orchestra, predecessor of the Royal Scottish National Orchestra.

Published popular music 
 "Actions Speak Louder Than Words" w. George Horncastle m. Felix McGlennon
 "Don't mind, my Darling!" w.m. Paul Steinmark
 "Hey, Rube!" w. J. Sherrie Matthews m. Harry Bulger
 "High School Cadets March" m. John Philip Sousa
 "Little Boy Blue" w. Eugene Field m. Ethelbert Nevin
 "The Man Who Broke The Bank At Monte Carlo" w.m. Fred Gilbert
 "The Miner's Dream Of Home" w.m. Will Godwin & Leo Dryden
 "Molly O!" w.m. William J. Scanlan
 "Narcissus" m. Ethelbert Nevin
 "The Pardon Came Too Late" w.m. Paul Dresser
 "The Picture That's Turned To The Wall" w.m. Charles Graham
 "Reuben And Cynthia" w.m. Percy Gaunt
 "Ta-ra-ra-boom-de-ay" w.m. Henry J. Sayers
 "Wot Cher!" w. Albert Chevalier m. Charles Ingle

Recorded popular music 
 "Bell Buoy" – J. W. Myers
 "The Cobbler" – George J. Gaskin
 "College Songs" – Gilmore's Band
 "Dance of the Owls" – A. T. Van Winkle (Xylophone) & Edward Issler (Piano)
 "Drill, Ye Tarriers, Drill" – George J. Gaskin
 "Five Minutes With The Minstrels" –  Voss' First Regiment Band
 "Home, Sweet, Home" – John York AtLee
"The Laughing Song" – George W. Johnson
 "Little 'Liza Loves You" – Len Spencer
 "Michael Casey as a Physician" – Russell Hunting
 "Nannon Waltz" – Issler's Orchestra
 "One Minute Too Late" – Voss' First Regiment Band
 "Paddy's Wedding" –  Dan Kelly
 "Pat Brady as a Police Justice" – Dan Kelly
 "Pat Brady on a Spree" – Dan Kelly
 "The Picture Turned to the Wall" – George J. Gaskin
 "The Picture Turned to the Wall" – Manhansett Quartette
 "Rocked in the Cradle of the Deep" – Holding's Parlor Orchestra
 "Sally in Our Alley" – Manhansett Quartette'
 "Saving Them All for Mary" – Al Reeves
 "Sweet Marie" – George J. Gaskin
 "Turkey in the Straw" – Billy Golden
 "Uncle Jefferson – Billy Golden
 "Vienna Dudes March" – Duffy and Imgrund's Fifth Regiment Band
"The Whistling Coon" – George W. Johnson

Classical music
 Anton Arensky – Cantata on the 10th Anniversary of the Coronation
 Claude Debussy – Two Arabesques
 Johannes Brahms – Clarinet Quintet in B Minor, Op. 115
 Max Bruch – Concerto for Violin No. 3
 Heinrich von Herzogenberg – Requiem, Op. 72 
 Carl Nielsen – Fantasy Pieces for Oboe and Piano
 Ethelbert Nevin – Water Scenes
 Erik Satie – 6 Gnossiennes for piano
 Alphons Czibulka – Wintermärchen Waltzes Op. 366 (source of Hearts and Flowers)

Opera
 Frederick Delius – Irmelin
 Robert Fuchs – Die Teufelsglocke
 Miguel Marqués – El monaguillo (libretto by Emilio Sánchez Pastor, premiered in Madrid)
 Pietro Mascagni – L'amico Fritz
 Emile Pessard – Les folies amoureuses premiered on April 15 at the Théâtre de l'Opéra-Comique, Paris

Musical theater
 Robin Hood, Broadway production
 The Tyrolean, Broadway production
 Der Vogelhändler (The Tyrolean), Vienna production

Births 
 January 25 – Wellman Braud, jazz musician (died 1966)
 February 5 – Dino Borgioli, operatic tenor (died 1960)
 March 22 – Alexis Roland-Manuel, French composer and critic (died 1966)
 March 28 – Leah Frances Russell, Australian opera singer (died 1983)
 April 2 – Jack Buchanan, Scottish singer, actor, dancer and director (died 1957)
 April 23 – Sergei Prokofiev, composer (died 1953)
 May 16 – Richard Tauber, Austrian singer (died 1948)
 May 26 – Mamie Smith, blues singer (died 1946)
 May 30 – Ben Bernie, US bandleader (died 1943)
 June 3 – Georges Guibourg, French singer, actor and writer (died 1970)
 June 9 – Cole Porter, songwriter (died 1964)
 June 10 – Al Dubin, Swiss-born American lyricist (died 1945)
 June 21 – Hermann Scherchen, German conductor (died 1966)
 July 14 – Fréhel, French singer and actress (died 1951)
 July 16 – Blossom Seeley, US singer and vaudeville performer (died 1974)
 August 2 – Arthur Bliss, composer (died 1975)
 September 11 – Noël Gallon, French composer and music educator (died 1966)
 September 14 – Czesław Marek, Polish composer, pianist, and piano teacher (died 1985)
 September 26 – Charles Munch, Alsatian symphonic conductor and violinist (died 1968)
 October 1 – Morfydd Llwyn Owen, Welsh singer and composer (died 1918) 
 October 29 – Fanny Brice, US actress, comedian and singer (died 1951)
 November 27 – Giovanni Breviario, operatic tenor (died 1982)
 date unknown
 Charles McCarron, composer and lyricist (died 1919)
 Margaret Morris, dancer and choreographer (died 1980)

Deaths 
 January 5 – Emma Abbott, singer (born 1850)
 January 8 – Fredrik Pacius, composer and conductor (born 1809)
 January 17 – Johannes Verhulst, conductor and composer (born 1816)
 January 16 – Léo Delibes, composer (born 1836)
 January 21 – Calixa Lavallée, composer (born 1842)
 May 23 – Ignace Leybach, pianist, organist and composer (born 1817)
 June 14 – Count Nicolò Gabrielli, Italian opera composer (born 1814 
 July 3 – Stefano Golinelli, pianist and composer (born 1818)
 July 21 – Franco Faccio, composer and conductor (born 1840)
 August 5/6 – Henry Litolff, keyboard virtuoso and composer (born 1818)
 September 2 – Ferdinand Praeger, composer, music teacher, pianist and writer (b. 1815)
 October 27 
Charles Constantin, conductor (born 1835)
Johann Dubez, Viennese violinist and composer (born 1828)
 November 9 – Frederick Mathushek, piano maker (born 1814)
 November 20 – Franz Hitz, Swiss pianist and composer (born 1828)
 December 28 – Alfred Cellier, composer (born 1844)
date unknown 
Harvey B. Dodworth, bandmaster and conductor (born 1822)
Fanny Salvini-Donatelli, operatic soprano (born c.1815)

References

 
1890s in music
19th century in music
Music by year